Lutheran Mariology or Lutheran Marian theology is derived from Martin Luther's views of Mary, the mother of Jesus and these positions have influenced those taught by the Lutheran Churches. Lutheran Mariology developed out of the deep Christian Marian devotion on which Luther was reared, and it was subsequently clarified as part of his mature Christocentric theology and piety. Lutherans hold Mary in high esteem, universally teaching the dogmas of the Theotokos and the Virgin Birth. Luther dogmatically asserted what he considered firmly established biblical doctrines such as the divine motherhood of Mary while adhering to pious opinions of the Immaculate Conception and the perpetual virginity of Mary, along with the caveat that all doctrine and piety should exalt and not diminish the person and work of Jesus Christ. By the end of Luther's theological development, his emphasis was always placed on Mary as merely a receiver of God's love and favour. His opposition to regarding Mary as a mediatrix of intercession or redemption was part of his greater and more extensive opposition to the belief that the merits of the saints could be added to those of Jesus Christ to save humanity. Lutheran denominations may differ in their teaching with respect to various Marian doctrines and have contributed to producing ecumenical meetings and documents on Mary.

Overview

Despite Luther's harsh polemics against his Roman Catholic opponents over issues concerning Mary and the saints, theologians appear to agree that Luther adhered to the Marian decrees of the ecumenical councils and dogmas of the church. He held fast to the belief that Mary was a perpetual virgin and the Theotokos, the Mother of God. Special attention is given to the assertion that Luther, some 300 years before the dogmatization of the Immaculate Conception by Pope Pius IX in 1854, was a firm adherent of that view. Others maintain that Luther in later years changed his position on the Immaculate Conception, which at that time was undefined in the Church; however, he maintained belief in Mary's lifelong sinlessness. Regarding the Assumption of Mary, he stated that the Bible did not say anything about it. Important to him was the belief that Mary and the saints do live on after death.

The centerpiece of Luther's Marian views was his 1521 Commentary on the Magnificat in which he extolled the magnitude of God's grace toward Mary and her own legacy of Christian instruction and example demonstrated in her canticle of praise. This canticle continues to have an important place in Lutheran liturgy.

Doctrines

Mother of God
Lutherans believe that the person Jesus is God the Son, the second Person of the Trinity, who was incarnated in the womb of his mother Mary as a human being, and since, as a person, he was "born of the Virgin Mary". Lutherans have always believed that Mary is the Theotokos, the God-bearer. Martin Luther said:
 This belief was officially confessed by Lutherans in their Formula of Concord, Solid Declaration, article VIII.24:

Virgin Birth
The Lutheran Churches teach the doctrine of the virgin birth, as summarized in the Formula of Concord in the Solid Declaration, Article VIII.24.

Perpetual virginity

Luther accepted the idea of the perpetual virginity of Mary. Jaroslav Pelikan noted that the perpetual virginity of Mary was Luther's lifelong belief, and Hartmann Grisar, a Roman Catholic biographer of Luther, concurs that "Luther always believed in the virginity of Mary, even post partum, as affirmed in the Apostles' Creed, though afterwards he denied her power of intercession, as well as that of the saints in general, resorting to many misinterpretations and combated, as extreme and pagan, the extraordinary veneration which the Catholic Church showed towards Mary."

The Smalcald Articles, a confession of faith of the Lutheran Churches, affirm the doctrine of the perpetual virginity of Mary. As such, this belief in the perpetual virginity of Mary was held by the Lutheran scholastics, including Johann Konrad Wilhelm Löhe. For this reason Confessional Lutheran scholars, such as Franz Pieper (1852–1931) refused to follow the tendency among non-Lutheran Protestants to insist that Mary and Joseph had marital relations and children after the birth of Jesus. It is implicit in his Christian Dogmatics that belief in Mary's perpetual virginity is the older and traditional view among Lutherans. Some American Lutheran groups such as the Lutheran Church–Missouri Synod, however, later "found no difficulty with the view that Mary and Joseph themselves together had other children". Another American Lutheran denomination, the Evangelical Catholic Church, on the other hand, considered "Saint Mary Ever Virgin, a title affirmed in The Smalcald Articles (Part One, IV [Latin]), and She recognizes her as that Most Praiseworthy Virgin (Augsburg Confession III, 1 [German]; Formula of Concord VIII; Solid Declaration 100 [Latin])."

Immaculate Conception
In 1532, Luther said: 'God has formed the soul and body of the Virgin Mary full of the Holy Spirit, so that she is without all sins, for she has conceived and borne the Lord Jesus.' Elsewhere, "All seed except Mary was vitiated [by original sin]." When concentrating specifically on Mary herself as the Mother of God, Luther acknowledges God's singular action in bringing her into the world, but in making general comments about the universality of human sinfulness, he includes her among all the rest of humanity.

Queen of Heaven
In his earlier years, Luther referred to Mary as the "Queen of Heaven", but he warned against people using the term too much. Luther later rejected this title due to its lack of scriptural evidence and the fact that he felt that Mary's accomplishments should be ultimately attributed to Christ.

Mediatrix
Before 1516, Luther's belief that Mary is a mediatrix between God and humanity was driven by his fear of Jesus being the implacable judge of all people. "The Virgin Mary remains in the middle between Christ and humankind. For in the very moment he was conceived and lived, he was full of grace. All other human beings are without grace, both in the first and second conception. But the Virgin Mary, though without grace in the first conception, was full of grace in the second ... whereas other human beings are conceived in sin, in soul as well as in body, and Christ was conceived without sin in soul as well as in body, the Virgin Mary was conceived in body without grace but in soul full of grace."

Luther later rejected the stance of Mary as a mediator between Christ and humanity. Luther claimed that though Mary possessed many virtues, she could not intercede for sinners. He claimed that the evidence for Mary's powers as a mediatrix was a result of improper translation of the Annunciation. Instead, Luther believed that Mary's lack of power to intercede is seen in her praising God and his blessings, not in taking credit for herself.

Development of doctrine
The term "Mariology", although used by some Lutherans across liberal-conservative lines, was not originally a term coined by Lutherans. Today, some Lutherans prefer not to use the term "Mariology" to describe their own Marian doctrine because they are concerned the term implies an acceptance of the concept of development of doctrine. Additionally, some Lutherans only use the term in an external sense, such as describing Roman Catholic, Eastern Orthodox, or Anglican teachings concerning Mary.

Veneration

Luther composed a number of venerational poems, which focus on Mary's virginity. He also translated old devotional Latin hymns on Mary into German. They express in various ways the incarnation of God through a virgin:

The Lutheran views on the veneration of Mary were interpreted differently by different theologians over time. Key is his interpretation of the Magnificat of Mary, which to some is a relic of the Catholic past, but to others a clear indication that he maintained a Marian piety. Luther states in his Magnificat that one should pray to Mary, so God would give and do, through her will, what we ask. But, he adds, it is God's work alone. Some interpret his Magnificat as a personal supplication to Mary, but not as a prayerful request for mediation. An important indicator of Luther's views on the veneration of Mary are not only his writings but also approved practices of Lutherans during his lifetime. The singing of the Magnificat in Latin was maintained in many German Lutheran communities. The Church Order (Kirchenordnung) of Brandenburg, Bugenhagen Braunschweig and other cities and districts decreed by the royal heads of the Lutheran Church maintained three Marian feast days to be observed as public holidays. It is known that Martin Luther approved of this. He also approved of keeping Marian paintings and statues in the Churches. He also advocated the use of the pre-Trent version of the Hail Mary (that is, "Hail Mary, full of grace, the Lord is with thee. Blessed art thou among women and blessed is the fruit of thy womb, Jesus.") as a sign of reverence for and devotion to the Blessed Virgin. The 1522 Betbüchlein (Prayer Book) retained the Ave Maria.

Comparison to Roman Catholic and Reformed views
Luther came to criticize Roman Catholics for blurring the distinction between high admiration of the grace of God wherever it is manifested in human beings and religious service offered to them and other mere creatures. In some instances he considered the Roman Catholic practice of making intercessory requests addressed especially to Mary and other departed saints to be idolatry.

This distinction separates Lutheran views from Roman Catholic Mariology. It is also significant in the context of Roman Catholic claims that modern Protestants deserted Luther's Mariology. Roman Catholics and Protestants may have held some similar views on Mary in the 16th century, but for Luther it was a "passive" Mariology, while for Roman Catholics it was "active" in suggesting devout veneration ("hyperdulia") and constant prayers for intercession. Questions have been raised as to whether the Marian views of Martin Luther could bring separated Christians closer together. There seems to be scepticism on both sides. The eighth "Lutherans and Catholics in Dialogue" addressed these issues.

Throughout Luther's life, he called Mary by the title Theotokos, Mother of God,. Martin Luther as well as Martin Chemnitz, "the other Martin" of early Lutheranism, are said to have prayed the pre-Trent Hail Mary, and very likely other suddenly-ex-Catholic Lutheran priests who were contemporaries of the two Martins likewise did. Modern Lutheran synods usually reject or at least do not actively recommend the practice of directly addressing Mary and other saints in prayers of admiration or petition as part of their religious worship of God.

Lutherans defended various Marian doctrines, such as the perpetual virginity of Mary, in order to distinguish and distance themselves from the Reformed (Calvinists). When a Reformed preacher came to Saint Bartholomew's Lutheran Church in 1589 and preached against images, the Lutheran Church Fathers responded by placing a statue of the Virgin Mary on the high altar of the church, causing the preacher to retire to a quieter parish. In general, Calvinist iconoclasm "provoked reactive riots by Lutheran mobs" in Germany and "antagonized the neighbouring Eastern Orthodox" in the Baltic region. At Saint Marien Church in Danzig, Lutheran clergy retained sacred artwork depicting the Coronation of the Virgin Mary and lit candles beside it during the period of Calvinist dominance in the region.

See also

 John Calvin's views on Mary
 Mariology of Petrus Canisius
 Marian doctrines of the Roman Catholic Church
 History of Roman Catholic Mariology
 Ecumenical meetings and documents on Mary

References

Sources

Further reading
 Grisar, Hartmann. Martin Luther: His Life and Work. Westminster, MD: Newman Press, 1950.  
 Pelikan, Jaroslav J. Mary Through the Centuries: Her Place in the History of Culture. New Haven: Yale University Press, 1996  
 Tappolet, Walter, and Ebneter, Albert, eds. Das Marienlob der Reformatoren. Tübingen: Katzmann Verlag, 1962

External links 
Luther’s Love for St. Mary, Queen of Heaven by Deaconess Betsy Karkan of Concordia University-Chicago - Lutheran Reformation

Luther, Martin
Mariology
Mariology